Details of the 2014 All-Ireland Minor B Hurling Championship.

Overview

Kerry are the defending champions, having beaten Wicklow in the 2013 All-Ireland final. The championship began on 7 August 2014.

Fixtures/results

Quarter-finals

Semi-final

Final

References

2014 All-Ireland Minor B Hurling Championship